The men's freestyle bantamweight competition at the 1936 Summer Olympics in Berlin took place from 2 August to 5 August at the Deutschlandhalle. Nations were limited to one competitor. This weight class was limited to wrestlers weighing up to 56kg.

This freestyle wrestling competition continued to use the "bad points" elimination system introduced at the 1928 Summer Olympics for Greco-Roman and at the 1932 Summer Olympics for freestyle wrestling, with a slight modification. Each round featured all wrestlers pairing off and wrestling one bout (with one wrestler having a bye if there were an odd number). The loser received 3 points if the loss was by fall or unanimous decision and 2 points if the decision was 2-1 (this was the modification from prior years, where all losses were 3 points). The winner received 1 point if the win was by decision and 0 points if the win was by fall. At the end of each round, any wrestler with at least 5 points was eliminated.

Schedule

Results

Round 1

The four wrestlers who won by fall took the lead, with 0 bad points. The three other winners by decision each received 1 point. All of the losers were defeated by either fall or unanimous decision, so each received 3 points.

 Bouts

	

 Points

Round 2

Herbert was the only wrestlers to win a second time by fall, staying at 0 points. Flood, Tuvesson, and Zombori all finished the round with 1 point, having won once by decision and once by fall. Nizzola's first points were a pair of points received for his loss by split decision to Zombori. Three men ended the round with 3 points, and two wrestlers had 4. The four competitors who lost in each of the first two rounds were eliminated.

 Bouts

	

 Points

Round 3

Four more men suffered their second losses in this round and were eliminated with 5 points or more. Herbert continued to be the only wrestler with 0 points, winning a third bout by fall. Flood stayed at 1 point, but Tuvesson picked up a second. The three other wrestlers who remained in contention each had 4 points.

 Bouts

	

 Points

Round 4

Herbert received his first points, 2 for a split-decision loss to Tuvesson. This moved Tuvesson from 2 points to 3, leaving Flood (who won by fall in the round) in the lead at 1 point. Jaskari and Çakiryildiz were eliminated with their losses. The official report placed Jaskari 5th and Çakiryildiz 6th.

 Bouts

	

 Points

Round 5

After keeping a perfect record through three rounds, Herbert's consecutive losses in rounds 4 and 5 resulted in his elimination. As he finished with fewer bad points than Tuvesson who was also eliminated in this round, however, Herbert earned the bronze medal. Tuvesson finished fourth despite losing only once; his previous three wins by decision gave him too many points to continue after a single defeat. Zombori hung on for the second straight round after reaching 4 points in round 3. Flood picked up a second point in the win by decision over Tuvesson.

 Bouts

	

 Points

Round 6

Zombori won his third consecutive match by fall, winning the gold medal after being pushed to the brink of elimination in the third round. Flood finished with the silver medal.

 Bouts

	

 Points

References

Wrestling at the 1936 Summer Olympics